Thomas Hervey may refer to

Thomas Hervey (politician) (1699–1775), English writer and member of parliament 
Thomas Hervey (landowner) (1625–1693), landowner and member of parliament 
Thomas Kibble Hervey (1799–1859), Scottish poet

See also
Thomas Harvey (disambiguation)